PK-14 Lower Dir-II is a constituency for the Khyber Pakhtunkhwa Assembly of the Khyber Pakhtunkhwa province of Pakistan.

Summary

1 » Percentage of Votes Polled to Registered Voters

Elections 2013
General election were held on May 11, 2013 in Pakistan. The total number of registered votes was 131,441 according to the Election Commission of Pakistan. The percentage of votes polled to registered voters was 32.65%. Like previous elections women were intimidated from voting and only a few women voted. The following table shows the names of the candidates and their parties and the votes they secured in the elections.

Elections 2008
The winner of the General elections 2008 in this constituency was Zakir Ullah Khan. He was a candidate of the Pakistan Peoples Party Parliamentarians.

Elections 2002
The winner of the General elections 2002 in this constituency was Zakir Ullah Khan. He was a candidate of the Muttahidda Majlis-e-Amal Pakistan.

See also
 PK-13 Lower Dir-I
 PK-15 Lower Dir-III

References

Khyber Pakhtunkhwa Assembly constituencies